CSL as an abbreviation may stand for:

Places
 Coordinated Science Laboratory, at the University of Illinois
 Liège Space Center (Centre spatial de Liège), at the University of Liege in Belgium
 Central Science Laboratory, a former UK DEFRA laboratory services agency

Languages
 Croatian Sign Language, a sign language for the deaf in Croatia 
 Chinese Sign Language, a sign language for the deaf in China, Malaysia, and Taiwan
 Clay Sanskrit Library, a series of books in Sanskrit with English translations
 Context-sensitive language, a class of formal languages in computational linguistics

Sciences
 Crosshole sonic logging, method for testing a constructed material
 Calcium stearoyl-2-lactylate, a food additive used as an emulsifier
 Continuous spontaneous localization, a dynamical reduction theory in quantum mechanics
 Hartmann's solution, compound sodium lactate, used in intravenous transfusions

Military
 Cooperative Security Location, a US military facility
 CSL, the designation code for Royal Australian Navy Wattle-class crane stores lighters

Computing
 Citation Style Language, an open XML-based standard to format citations and bibliographies
 Current-steering logic, an alternative name for emitter-coupled logic in electronics
 Context-sensitive language, a language generated from a context-sensitive grammar

Companies
 CSL Mobile, subsidiary of Hong Kong Telecom
 CSL Limited, an Australian biotechnology company, formerly Commonwealth Serum Laboratories
CSL Behring, a daughter company of CSL Limited
 Canada Steamship Lines, a Canadian shipping company
 CSL Sofas, a furniture chain in the United Kingdom
 Cochin Shipyard Limited, a shipbuilding company in Kerala, India

Sports
 CAL Spora Luxembourg, amateur athletics club in Luxembourg
 Canadian Soccer League, a soccer league in Canada since 2006
 Canadian Soccer League (1987–1992), a soccer league in Canada
 Chinese Super League, the premier league of association football in China
 Cosmopolitan Soccer League, a soccer league in United States

Politics
 Canadian Socialist League, a political party active from 1898 to 1904
 Czechoslovak People's Party (Československá strana lidová, ČSL), a political party

Others
 Centers for Spiritual Living, a religious denomination
 Certain models of BMW car, designated BMW CSL
 Charter seat license, name used by a few sports teams for a personal seat license